Hazel Court (10 February 1926 – 15 April 2008) was an English actress. She is known for her roles in British and American horror films during the 1950s and early 1960s, including Terence Fisher's The Curse of Frankenstein (1957) and The Man Who Could Cheat Death (1959) for Hammer Film Productions, and three of Roger Corman's adaptations of Edgar Allan Poe stories for American International Pictures: The Premature Burial (1962), The Raven (1963) and The Masque of the Red Death (1964).

Early life
Court was born in Sutton Coldfield, Warwickshire. Her father, G.W. Court, was a cricketer who played for Durham CCC. She attended Boldmere School and Highclare College, and later studied drama at the Birmingham Repertory Theatre and the Alexandra Theatre.

Career
At the age of sixteen, Court met film director Anthony Asquith in London; the meeting gained her a brief part in Champagne Charlie (1944). Court won a British Critics Award for her role as a crippled girl in Carnival (1946). She also appeared in Holiday Camp (1947) and Bond Street (1948). Her first role in a fantasy film was in Ghost Ship (1952). Devil Girl from Mars (1954) was a low-budget film produced by the Danziger Brothers.

Court trained at the Rank Organisation's "charm school". She wanted to act in comedy films but also continued to appear in horror films and, in 1957, had what was to become a career-defining role in the first colour Hammer Horror film The Curse of Frankenstein (1957).

In the 1957–58 television season, she co-starred in a CBS sitcom filmed in Britain, Dick and the Duchess, as Jane Starrett, a patrician British woman married to insurance claims investigator (Patrick O'Neal). Court travelled back and forth between North America and Britain, appearing in four episodes of Alfred Hitchcock Presents. She had parts in A Woman of Mystery (1958); The Man Who Could Cheat Death (1959); an entry in the British film series the Edgar Wallace Mysteries (US: The Edgar Wallace Mystery Theatre), The Man Who Was Nobody (1960); and in Doctor Blood's Coffin (1961) among others.

By the early 1960s, Court was based in the United States. She featured in the Edgar Allan Poe horror films The Premature Burial (1962) with Ray Milland, The Raven (1963) with Peter Lorre and Boris Karloff and The Masque of the Red Death (1964), the last two with Vincent Price. She appeared on occasion in the early 1960s TV anthology series, The Dick Powell Show (aka, The Dick Powell Theatre).

Court also appeared in episodes of several TV series, including Adventures in Paradise, Mission: Impossible, Bonanza, Dr. Kildare, Danger Man, Twelve O'Clock High, Burke's Law with Gene Barry, Sam Benedict starring Edmond O'Brien, Gidget with Sally Field, McMillan and Wife with Rock Hudson, Mannix, The Wild Wild West, Thriller hosted by Boris Karloff, Rawhide ("Incident of the Dowry Dundee") with Clint Eastwood, and in The Fear, the penultimate episode of the original 1959-1964 The Twilight Zone hosted by Rod Serling.

Court appeared briefly in Omen III: The Final Conflict (uncredited, 1981).

In addition to acting, she studied sculpting in Italy and was a painter and sculptor.

Personal life
Court was married to actor Dermot Walsh from 1949 until 1963. They had a daughter, Sally Walsh, who appeared with her mother in The Curse of Frankenstein. In 1964, Court married actor and director Don Taylor, whom she met while they were shooting an episode of Alfred Hitchcock Presents. They had two children.  They were married until Taylor's death in 1998.

Death 
Court died of a heart attack at her home near Lake Tahoe, California, on 15 April 2008, aged 82. Her autobiography, Horror Queen, was released in the UK by Tomahawk Press a week after her death.

Selected filmography

1944: Champagne Charlie - Tipsy Champagne Drinker (uncredited)
1944: Dreaming - Miss Grey / Wren / Avalah
1946: Gaiety George (a.k.a. Showtime) - Elizabeth Brown
1946: Carnival - May Raeburn
1947: Hungry Hill - Minor Role (uncredited)
1947: The Root of All Evil - Rushie
1947: Meet Me at Dawn - Gabrielle Vermorel
1947: Dear Murderer - Avis Fenton
1947: Holiday Camp - Joan Huggett
1948: My Sister and I - Helena Forsythe
1948: Bond Street - Julia Chester-Barrett
1949: Forbidden - Jeannie Thompson
1952: Ghost Ship - Margaret Thornton
1953: Counterspy (a.k.a. Undercover Agent) - Clare Manning
1954: Devil Girl from Mars - Ellen
1954: The Scarlet Web - Susan Honeywell
1954: A Tale of Three Women - Trude (segment "Wedding Gift' story)
1956: The Narrowing Circle - Rosemary Speed
1956: Behind the Headlines - Maxine
1957: Hour of Decision - Peggy Sanders
1957: The Curse of Frankenstein - Elizabeth
1958: A Woman of Mystery - Joy Grant
1958-1961: Alfred Hitchcock Presents (TV Series) - Charlotte Jameson Rutherford / Helen Brathwaite / Lady Gwendolyn Avon / Phyllis Chaundry
1958: The Invisible Man (TV Series) - Penny Page
1959: Model for Murder - Sally Meadows
1959: Breakout - Rita Arkwright
1959: The Man Who Could Cheat Death - Janine Du Bois
1960: The Shakedown - Mildred Eyde
1960: Bonanza (Tv Series, Episode: "The Last Trophy") - Lady Beatrice Dunsford
1960: Edgar Wallace Mysteries (US: The Edgar Wallace Mystery Theatre), "The Man Who Was Nobody" - Marjorie Stedman
1960-1961: Danger Man (TV Series) - Francesca / Noelle Laurence
1961: Dr. Blood's Coffin - Nurse Linda Parker
1961: Thriller (TV Series) - Leonie Vicek
1961: Mary Had a Little... - Laurel Clive
1961: Stagecoach West (TV series)  Episode: "Finn McCool" - Sybil Allison
1962: The Premature Burial - Emily Gault
1963: The Raven - Lenore Craven
1964: Rawhide (TV Series, Episode: "Incident of the Dowery Dundee") - Kathleen Dundee
1964: The Twilight Zone (TV Series, Episode: "The Fear") - Charlotte Scott
1964: The Masque of the Red Death - Juliana
1966: Mission: Impossible (TV Series, season 2 ep. 10: "Charity") - Catherine Hagar
1972: McMillan & Wife (TV Series, Episode: "The Face of Murder") - Frances Mayerling
1981: Omen III: The Final Conflict - Champagne Woman At Hunt (uncredited) (final film role)

Bibliography

References

External links

 

1926 births
2008 deaths
20th-century English actresses
Actresses from Birmingham, West Midlands
British expatriate actresses in the United States
English film actresses
English television actresses
People from Sutton Coldfield